Daniel Dicks "Danny" Guice (November 30, 1924 – April 13, 2017) was an American lawyer and politician.

Background
Born in Biloxi, Mississippi, Guice graduated from Biloxi High School. He then went to Tulane University and received his law degree from Tulane University Law School. He also went to the University of Mississippi. He practiced law in Biloxi, Mississippi.

From 1956 to 1960, Guice served in the Mississippi House of Representatives. He then served as Mayor of Biloxi from 1961 to 1973. Guice was a Democrat. From 1977 to 1990, Guice served as a county court judge for Harrison County, Mississippi.

In 1980 he appeared on the game show Family Feud as the leader of the Guice family team, which won $28,659. His son was Daniel Guice Jr. who also served in the Mississippi Legislature.

Death
Guice died on April 13, 2017 at his home. He was 92.

References

External links

1924 births
2017 deaths
Mayors of Biloxi, Mississippi
University of Mississippi alumni
Tulane University Law School alumni
Mississippi state court judges
Democratic Party members of the Mississippi House of Representatives
20th-century American judges